In 2018 a series of clashes occurred in the Central African Republic town of Batangafo between Anti-balaka and Ex-Séléka militias.

Timeline of events 
 31 October: Anti-balaka fighters stabbed motorcyclist from Kabo who delivered vaccines to hospital. In retaliation Ex-Séléka fighters attacked IDP camps burning shelters.
 1 November: Ex-Séléka attacked and looted places in Batangafo. MINUSCA reinforcement arrived.
 2 November: Reinforcement from Kabo and Kaga-Bandoro for Ex-Séléka and from Ouogo/Kambakota for Anti-balaka arrived.
 4 November: Young people demonstrated against MINUSCA.
 5 November: Continuous fight between Ex-Séléka and Anti-balaka.
 6 November: Demonstration against Pakistani troops. Another MINUSCA reinforcement arrived.
 7 November: Fightings largely stop. Another MINUSCA reinforcement arrived.
 8 November: Anti-balaka barriers disappeared. 5,100 tents have been destroyed.
 11 November: Anti-balaka blocked access to hospital for people from Lakouanga.
 12 November: MINUSCA dispersed Anti-balaka.
 13 November: Women and children protested against MINUSCA inaction.
 15 November: FPRC threatened to burn down the hospital.
 17 November: Meeting between MINUSCA and Ex-Séléka on ultimatum.

Fatalities 
15 people were killed and 29 were injured as a result of the clashes. 20,809 people were displaced, 5,141 huts (93 percent of the
total) and 200 houses were burnt.

References  
 

Central African Republic Civil War
Batangafo clashes
Ouham
Batangafo clashes
Batangafo clashes
Massacres in the Central African Republic